Andre Johnson (born 1981) is a former American football wide receiver.

Andre Johnson may also refer to:
 Andre Johnson (offensive lineman) (born 1973), former American football offensive tackle
 Jah Mason (born 1970), stage name of Jamaican reggae singer Andre Johnson
 The real name of rapper Andre Johnson, of Northstar
 Andre Johnson, character in Black-ish